Celaenorrhinus asmara, commonly known as the white-banded flat, is a species of hesperiid butterfly which is found in South and Southeast Asia.

Range
The butterfly occurs in India, Myanmar, Malaysia, Thailand, Laos, Vietnam, and Indonesia. The butterfly occurs in India from Assam onward to the Karen Hills in Myanmar.

Status
In 1932, William Harry Evans reported that Celaenorrhinus asmara was not rare in India and Myanmar.

Cited references

See also
Hesperiidae
List of butterflies of India (Hesperiidae)

References

Print

Online

Asmara
Butterflies of Asia
Butterflies described in 1879
Butterflies of Indochina
Taxa named by Arthur Gardiner Butler